Edward Livingston (1764-1836) was an American who served as the U.S. Secretary of State, U.S. Minister to France, U.S. Senator, U.S. Representative, Mayor of New York City.

Edward Livingston may also refer to:
 Edward Livingston (speaker) (1796–1840), American who served as the Speaker of the New York State Assembly
 Edward Philip Livingston (1779–1843), American who served as the Lieutenant Governor of New York
 Edward Livingston (clubman) (1834–1906), American businessman who was prominent in New York society
 Edward De Peyster Livingston (1861–1932), American lawyer and society leader during the Gilded Age

See also
Eddie Livingstone (Edward James Livingstone, 1884–1945), Canadian sports team owner
J. Ed Livingston (J. Edwin Livingston, 1892–1971), Chief Justice of the Supreme Court of Alabama
Burton Edward Livingston (1875–1948), American botanist
Edward Livingston Trudeau (1848–1915), American physician who established the Adirondack Cottage Sanitarium
Edward Livingston Wilson (1838–1903), American photographer
Edward Livingston Martin (1837–1897), American lawyer and politician from Delaware
Edward Livingston Youmans (1821–1887), American scientific writer, editor and founder of Popular Science magazine